The Long canyon is a submerged quarry located in the Kamensky district of the Rostov Oblast.

History 
On the place of the Long canyon, was a stone quarry. In 1970 during the work which was carried out with the help of an excavator something unexpected had happened, that caused career’s filling with water. The working team didn`t pick up their equipment and it was flooded at the bottom.

Description 
The Long canyon is considered to be the largest submerged quarry among the objects of the Rostov region. On the territory of the Long canyon a lake formed, which length is 2 kilometers 200 meters. The quarry is located 6 kilometers away to the south-west of the village Chistoozerny and 10 kilometers away to the south-east of Kamensk-Shakhtinsky. Maximum width of the lake is about 100 meters, depth of the lake is about 30–50 meters. The lake maintains underground streams. Water in the lake is cold even when the temperature of the air is very high. Coasts of the lake are rocky and steep, their height is 40 meters.

References 

Tourist attractions in Rostov Oblast
Lakes of Rostov Oblast